Shimonia fischeri is a moth in the family Cossidae. It is found in the Democratic Republic of the Congo, where it has been recorded from south-eastern region of the Congo Basin.

The wingspan is 45 mm for females.

Etymology
The species is named in honour of botanist Professor Dr. Eberhard Fischer.

References

Natural History Museum Lepidoptera generic names catalog

Metarbelinae
Endemic fauna of the Democratic Republic of the Congo
Moths described in 2013